Apache War Smoke is a 1952 American Western film directed by Harold F. Kress and starring Gilbert Roland, Glenda Farrell, and Robert Horton. The film is based on the 1939 short story "Stage Station" by Ernest Haycox. It was released by MGM on September 25, 1952. An outlaw murders several Apaches and flees to a stagecoach station with the tribe in hot pursuit.

Plot
Tom Herrera, the head of a stagecoach station in New Mexico, prepares to defend against an attack by an Apache party, seeking revenge for the killing of several Indians by an outlaw. When a stagecoach arrives at the station with passengers Nancy Dekker, Cyril R. Snowden, Lorraine Sayburn, and Fanny Webson, they are stranded at the station with Tom and his outlaw father Peso Herrera. Peso is the most wanted outlaw in the country and is after the gold contained in the casket of the stagecoach. Tom knowing about his father's intention takes his guns away as a precaution. As the Apaches begin their attack, suspicion is immediately cast on Peso as the reason for the Apaches attack. Tom and Fanny defend Peso when others in the station suggest Peso be turned over to the Indians to end the conflict quickly. Tom eventually wins the argument and Peso stays in the station.

However, with the help of Fanny, who gives her guns to Peso, he holds up Tom and the others and demands that they hand over the gold. Tom shoots the gun out of his father's hand. Despite the robbery attempt Tom continues to believe that his father is not responsible for the Indians attack. A fierce battle begins with the Indians and those trapped inside the station. During the fighting, an Indians emissary tries to negotiate the surrender of the murderer, but Tom again refuses to turn his father over and the fighting resumes. During the battle, Peso knocks out Pike Curtis, who Peso knows is the killer, and turns him over to the Indians. With all doubt about his father removed, Tom stays behind with Nancy, while the stagecoach leaves for San Francisco. Later, Madre informs Tom that the gold is not as safe as he thinks because the young boy assigned to guard the gold is actually another one of Peso's sons.

Cast
Gilbert Roland as Peso Herrera
Glenda Farrell as Fanny Webson
Robert Horton as Tom Herrera
Robert Blake as Luis Herrera
Barbara Ruick as Nancy Dekker
Gene Lockhart as Cyril R. Snowden
Harry Morgan as Ed Cotten
Patricia Tiernan as Lorraine Sayburn
Hank Worden as Amber
Myron Healey as Pike Curtis

Production
Some of the scenes from the 1942 MGM film Apache Trail, which was also based on Ernest Haycox's short story, were used in this movie. Many of the film's exteriors were shot on location in Soledad Canyon near Santa Clarita, California.

Box office
According to MGM records the movie earned $577,000 in the US and Canada and $220,000 elsewhere, making a profit of $121,000.

References

External links

1952 films
1952 Western (genre) films
1950s American films
1950s English-language films
American black-and-white films
American Western (genre) films
Films based on American short stories
Films directed by Harold F. Kress
Films set in New Mexico
Films shot in Los Angeles County, California
Metro-Goldwyn-Mayer films